The Director of Communications in the Prime Minister's Office is one of the most senior roles in the Canadian Prime Minister's Office, reporting directly to the prime minister and his or her chief of staff. The person is responsible for selling the government's agenda to the media and public. The portfolio thus encompasses everything from speech writing, communications packages, coordinating announcements, creating media appearances for the Prime Minister, crafting communications responses, liaising with the media, coordinating with ministers' and Members of Parliament's offices, and responding to government controversies.

The position is known for its incredibly long hours, grueling commitment to the job, strain on the person's family and general social life, and relatively quick burn-out period. The position regularly requires the director to be in the office from as early as 5:00am to as late as 1:00am, six or seven days per week, in order to monitor media developments and respond quickly when required. The position's grueling hours are close only to the Prime Minister's Chief of Staff and Director of Policy. In a February 2015 article, former Director of Communications Andrew MacDougall laid out his average day in that role, starting at 5:30am and describing his day until roughly 11:00pm.

Since 2006 only half of the directors have lasted more than one year, with the average in the position being just 395 days, or roughly 13 months. The longest serving director is Sandra Buckler, with over two years in the position, who was forced to leave in order to undergo cancer treatment. The shortest duration was just 32 days with William Stairs, who left shortly after Prime Minister Stephen Harper was elected with a minority government.

Previous Directors of Communications

References